Daniel Friedrich Ernst Meissel (31 July 1826, Eberswalde, Brandenburg Province – 11 March 1895, Kiel) was a German astronomer who contributed to various aspects of number theory.

See also
Meissel–Lehmer algorithm
Meissel–Mertens constant

External links
 

1826 births
1895 deaths
19th-century German astronomers
19th-century German mathematicians
Number theorists